Dimosthenis Kavouras (born 9 July 1962 in Chios) is a retired Greek football striker and later manager.

References

1962 births
Living people
Greek footballers
Panathinaikos F.C. players
Levadiakos F.C. players
OFI Crete F.C. players
Apollon Smyrnis F.C. players
Super League Greece players
Association football forwards
Greece international footballers
Greek football managers
Greece women's national football team managers

Sportspeople from Chios